Spider-Man and Friends was a line of action figures and related merchandise featuring the comic book character Spider-Man and other characters appearing in Marvel Comics publications, released by Marvel Entertainment's toy division, Toy Biz, from 2003 to 2006. The line was aimed primarily at preschool-age children, and the character likenesses used were often altered to seem "cuter" and more childlike (and child-friendly); most characters were depicted as wide-eyed and smiling, even supervillains and characters better known for anger or savagery, such as the Incredible Hulk or Wolverine. Aside from being a toy line, there were also books, clothing, board games, cutlery, plates, bedding and video games.

Featured characters

Heroes
 Spider-Man
 Spider-Girl-essentially a female counterpart to Spider-Man, wearing a near-identical costume; has no perceived connection to the Marvel Comics character of the same name or the various characters known as Spider-Woman. Story books under the Spider-Man and Friends brand name suggest that she is Spider-Man's cousin.
 Wolverine-some pieces of merchandise depict Wolverine in his Ultimate uniform while other merchandise depicts him in his tiger stripe costume. 
 Hulk
 Captain America
 Thor
 Cyclops
 Iron Man
 The Thing
 Mr. Fantastic
 Storm
 Iceman
 Colossus
 The Beast-for the most part, he is the same as the original Beast, but he is not a mutant, instead having been an ordinary boy (who appears similar to Beast's earliest appearances) who invented a potion that made him grow long blue hair.

Villains
 The Rhino
 The Lizard
 The Green Goblin
 Doctor Octopus

Promo-only characters
 The Silver Surfer
 Aunt May
 The Punisher
 The Sandman
 Electro

The end of Friends
The Spider-Man and Friends line ceased production at the end of 2006, when all toy licenses for Marvel Comics characters passed from Toy Biz to Hasbro; the final wave of figures was released in December 2006.

Hasbro currently continued the concept of Marvel characters for the preschool set with a new line of action figures called Marvel Super Hero Squad, which debuted in January 2007. Featured characters in Wave 1 include Archangel, Colossus, Captain America, Magneto, Sabretooth, Cyclops, Wolverine, and Hawkeye. Wave 2 included Hulk, Wasp, Iron Man, Thor, Daredevil, Elektra, Punisher, and Ghost Rider. Super Hero Squad figures were much smaller than their Spider-Man and Friends predecessors, and are comparable in size and design to a similarly preschool-specific line of Star Wars toys already produced by Hasbro. In 2009, an animated series based on the toy line debuted, titled The Super Hero Squad Show.

While Marvel Super Hero Squad is discontinued, Hasbro is currently continuing the concept of Marvel characters for the preschool set with Marvel Super Hero Adventures, and Spidey and his Amazing Friends.

Footnotes

Marvel Comics action figure lines
Spider-Man toys